Charles J. Fourie (born 1965, Potchefstroom) is a South African writer and director working in television, film and theater. Fourie staged his first play as a drama student at the Windybrow Theatre in 1985, and went on to receive the Henk Wybenga bursary as most promising student in the same year. In 2021/22 he received a writing and research fellowship from the Johannesburg Institute for Advanced Studies to develop a new theater format involving artificial intelligence. His latest radio-drama series Alleenmandaat is currently broadcasting on SABC (Radio Sonder Grense). As of April 2022 he will engage a residency fellowship with the Posthuman Art Network and Foreign Objekt to further develop his latest creative project  - AI Performance Narratives. Fourie's play The Parrot Woman was recently staged in September 2022 at the Market Theater in Johannesburg to wide acclaim with award-winning stage actors Gontse Ntshegang and Andre Lotter. https://mg.co.za/friday/2022-09-18-remembering-black-peoples-suffering-and-presence-in-the-anglo-boer-war-with-the-parrot-woman/

Theater
Over the past  thirty years Charles J. Fourie has written and staged over 60 different plays and cabarets presented in South Africa, the United Kingdom and USA. As writer and director he has also worked with well-known South African and British actors such as Linda Marlowe, Samantha Bond, Tobie Cronje, Chris Gxalaba, Vicky Kente, Jamie Bartlett, Trix Pienaar, Jarrid Geduld, and Deirdre Wolhuter to name a few.

His stories feature strong sociopolitical themes in award-winning historical and biographical plays such as Die Crazer, Big Boys, Don Gxubane onner die Boere, Vrygrond, Stander, Crime Babies, Vrededorp, Kurtz, The Parrot Woman, Goddess of Song, Demjanjuk, Braaivleis, The Lighthouse Keeper's Wife, and Agterplaas. More recent plays such as Vergifnis, Happy Sindane and Ella's Horses were staged to rave reviews at various arts festivals and received a Standard Bank Ovation award.

Other awards  for his work include the SACPAC best play award, Fleur Du Cap best new play award, Maskew Miller Longman award for drama, KKNK Nagtegaal best new play award, Sanlam radio drama award, and on two occasions the Amstel playwright of the year award. Several of his play have also been published.

Fourie has also written numerous radio drama series for the SABC (Radio Sonder Grense) since 2003, and his most recent 60 episode radio drama series Alleenmandaat was broadcast in 2022 to rave reviews.

He received the South African Academy of Science and Arts Medal of Honor for radio drama in 2015 and won several awards for his radio dramas.  As a film director he adapted four of his stage plays into films, which premiered on KykNET and SABC.

In recent years he was awarded a writing fellowship at the Johannesburg Institute for Advanced Studies in 2021 to develop a new project involving the use of artificial intelligence in a theater production, and in 2022 he received a  virtual residency with the Posthuman Art Network and Foreign Objekt based in Germany and Sweden.

Fourie returns to the Market Theater as writer and director in 2022 after his last plays Vrygrond and  Crime Babies were staged here. His play The Lighthouse Keeper's Wife is currently listed nation-wide as a set work for Grade 10 (English) learners.

Other writing

 ALLEENMANDAAT (drama series x 60 episodes) – SABC/RSG (2022) 
 GOUE KOORS (drama series x 60 episodes) – SABC/RSG (2021) 
 BRULSAND (drama series x 60 episodes) – SABC/RSG (2020)  
 RUST EN VREDE (drama series x 60 episodes) – SABC/RSG (2019)  
 AGTERPLAAS (drama series x 60 episodes) – SABC/RSG (2018) 
 TAMBOERYN (radio drama series x 60 episodes) – SABC/RSG (2017) 
 BINNELANDERS (drama series x 65 episodes) – KykNET (2016) 
 SACRIFICE (60 min radio drama feature) – BBC/UK (2016) 
 POTTIE POTGIETER – (drama series x 26 episodes) - SABC 2 (2015) 
 AGTERPLAAS – Silwerskerm Film Festival Feature - KykNET (2015) 
 BOGGOMSBAAI (drama series x 120 episodes) – Maroela Media (2015)  
 DEELTITEL-DAMES – (drama series x 13 episodes) – KykNET (2014)  
 HOME AFFAIRS – (drama series x 52 episodes) - SABC 3 (2014)  
 MONTANA – (drama series x 26 episodes) - SABC 1 (2014) 
 BOEKEPARADYS (drama series x 40 episodes) – Maroela Media (2014) 
 VERGIFNIS (60 min radio drama feature) SABC/RSG (2014) 
 SOS FAMILY OF MAN – (drama series x 52 episodes) - SABC 3 (2013)  
 SUBURBAN BLISS – (drama series x 26 episodes) - SABC 3 (2012) 
 PURGATORIO (drama series x 60 episodes) – SABC/RSG (2012)  
 PARADISO (drama series x 60 episodes) – SABC/RSG (2011) 
 VREDEDORP – (56 min Feature Film) – KykNET (2011)  
 STANDER – (56 min Feature Film) – KykNET (2011)  
 EILAND – (56 min Feature Film) – KykNET (2011) 
 INFERNO (drama series x 60 episodes) – SABC/RSG (2010)  
 SEISOENE (drama series x 60 episodes) –SABC/RSG (2009)  
 BESERINGSTYD (60 min radio drama feature) – SABC/RSG (2008)  
 PRAATMAAR (60 min radio drama feature) – SABC/RSG (2007)

Awards
 Amstel playwright of the year 1988
 AA Life Vita playwright of the year 1989 
 AA Life Vita best theatre production1989
 Pot-Pourri festival best production award 1990 
 Standard Bank ‘pick of the fringe’ award 1990 
 Amstel playwright of the year award 1993 
 SACPAC best play of the year award 1994 
 Fleur du Cap award best play nomination 1995 
 Foundation for the Creative Arts award 1996 
 ABSA KKNK Kanna theatre award 1998 
 Sanlam/RSG/SABC radio drama award 2000 
 KKNK/Nagtegaal best drama play award 2006
 Maskew Miller Longman Pearson literary award 2008 
 ATKV Woordveertjie nomination for best new play 2011
 KykNET Fiesta awards nominated in six categories 2012 
 KykNET Silwerskerm Film Festival nomination best script & director 2014 
 South African Academy for Arts and Science Medal of Honor 2015
 Sanlam/RSG/SABC Radio drama award winner for 2016
 ATKV Woordveertjie nomination for best new play 2017
 SAFTA best SA documentary nomination 2018
 Rogovy Foundation Documentary award 2019
 JIAS Creative Writing Fellowship 2021

Publications
Big Boys/More Market Theater Plays – Jonathan Ball Publishers 1993
Don Gxubane onner die Boere – New Contrast Publishers 1993
Vrygrond e.a. Dramas – Tafelberg Publishers 1994
Vonkfiksie – Human & Rousseau Publishers 1999
Vrededorp – Genugtig Publishers 2005
New South African Plays – Aurora Metro Publishers (UK) 2006
 'Kwintet' Ella se Perde – Maskew Miller Longman 2008
The Lighthouse Keeper's Wife – Maskew Miller Longman 2008
Droomskip e.a. Radio dramas – Nasou-Via Afrika 2009
Vrededorp – Protea Boekehuis 2011
The Lighthouse keeper's wife – NB Best Books 2015
Offer/Sacrifice – NB Best Books 2016
The Parrot Woman & other plays – Imagix Publications 2022

References

 Anoniem “Job word ’n SA plaaswerker” “Die Volksblad” 14 Januarie 1998
 Anoniem “Happy Sindane se storie ‘uit sy perspektief’ in verhoogstuk” “Beeld” 24 September 2014
 Beyers, Susanne “‘Moeilike’ Fourie vurig en liefdevol” “Die Burger” 2 Mei 2003
 Botha, Danie “‘Vrygrond’ onvergeetlik” “Die Burger” 20 April 1993
 Botha, M.C. “Charlie en die dramafabriek” “Insig” Oktober 2005
 Britz, Elretha “Fourie wen dramaprys” “Volksblad” 30 Oktober 2004
 Brümmer, Willemien “’n Gehunker verby zeflike” “By” 2 April 2011
 Burger, Kobus “Bundel SA dramas vir oorsese mark” “Plus” 5 September 2003
 Burger, Kobus “Charles Fourie wen dramaprys” “Plus” 29 Oktober 2004
 Burger, Kobus “Afrikaanse stukke vir TV verwerk” “Plus” 2 Julie 2005
 Burger, Kobus “SA dramas sien lig in Londen” “Beeld” 28 April 2006
 Du Toit, Pieter “Dis bos toe in donker verhaal” “Beeld” 29 September 2005
 Eie korrespondent “Afrikaanse stuk wen hoë prys” “Die Burger” 19 November 1992
 Eie korrespondent “Die dramas verskil, sê prof.” “Die Burger” 25 Maart 1993
 Fourie, Charles J. “Vrygrond is my own work” “New Nation” 14 Mei 1993
 Fourie, Charles J. “Dramaturg sing nie saam in koor” “Die Volksblad” 3 Augustus 1995
 Hambidge, Joan “Charles Fourie verdien al die gejuig” “Kalender” 8 Junie 1995
 Hough, Barrie “’n Vreugde vir Afrikaans, sê wenner Fourie” “Rapport” 29 November 1992
 Joubert, Emile “Die groot SA tradisie word ’n stedelike nagmerrie” “Die Burger” 7 April 1995
 Kunsredaksie “Fourie en Akerman deel Sakruk Toneelprys” “Die Burger” 12 Oktober 1993
 Pienaar, Jackie “Skrywer betrokke in nagtelike drama” “Die Burger” 29 Mei 1998
 Pople, Laetitia en Joubert, Emile “Vrae oor wen-drama se oorsprong” “Die Burger” 13 Maart 1993
 Pople, Laetitia “Ligte luim vervang '93 se 'post mortem'-fees. Fourie, Venter Kampustoneel-uitblinkers” Beeld” 15 April 1994
 Pople, Laetitia “Fourie op fees met drie werke” “Beeld” 9 Julie 2014
 Raubenheimer, Christel “Stuk oor ‘perdevrou’ fokus op aanvaarding” “Beeld” 27 September 2007
 Stehle, Rudolf “Fourie se ‘Happy’ is gereed vir verhoog” “Beeld” 20 Augustus 2013
 Taylor, René “Afrika vibreer in Londen” “Plus” 27 Maart 2002
 Wasserman, Herman “Charles & Jana” “De Kat” September 1998
 Beeld: http://152.111.1.88/argief/berigte/beeld/1990/07/21/2/42.html Geargiveer 1 Augustus 2012 op Wayback Machine
 Beyers, Susanne Die Burger: http://152.111.1.87/argief/berigte/dieburger/2003/05/02/BJ/02/02.html%5Bdooie+skakel%5D
 Brümmer, Willemien Die Burger: http://152.111.1.87/argief/berigte/dieburger/2011/04/02/BJ/11/Agterplaas.html%5Bdooie+skakel%5D
 Doollee: http://www.doollee.com/PlaywrightsF/fourie-charles-j.html Geargiveer 31 Augustus 2017 op Wayback Machine
 Du Toit, Pieter Beeld: http://152.111.1.88/argief/berigte/beeld/2005/09/29/B1/25/01.html Geargiveer 1 Augustus 2012
 Esat: http://esat.sun.ac.za/index.php/Marlene_Blom
 Esat: http://esat.sun.ac.za/index.php/Charles_J._Fourie
 Hambidge, Joan Beeld: http://152.111.1.88/argief/berigte/beeld/1995/06/8/3/9.html Geargiveer 1 Augustus 2012 op Wayback Machine
 Krueger, Anton LitNet: http://www.oulitnet.co.za/teater/parrot_woman.asp Geargiveer 3 Oktober 2018 op Wayback Machine
 Le Roux, Cornelia Die Burger: http://152.111.1.87/argief/berigte/dieburger/2005/03/11/KS/28/01.html%5Bdooie+skakel%5D
 LitNet ATKV-Skrywersalbum 13 Desember 2011: www.litnet.co.za
 Pienaar, Jackie Die Burger: http://152.111.1.87/argief/berigte/dieburger/1998/05/29/1/1.html
 Pople, Laetitia Beeld: http://152.111.1.88/argief/berigte/beeld/1992/11/26/6/3.html Geargiveer 1 Augustus 2012 op Wayback Machine
 Pople, Laetitia Die Burger: http://152.111.1.87/argief/berigte/dieburger/2011/04/05/SK/6/kknk2.html
 RSG Plus: http://www.rsgplus.org/drama/rsg-radiodrama-wenners-aangekondig/ Geargiveer 22 April 2016 op Wayback Machine
 Taylor, René Beeld: http://152.111.1.88/argief/berigte/beeld/2002/03/27/3/5.html Geargiveer 1 Augustus 2012 op Wayback Machine
 Wasserman, Herman Beeld: http://152.111.1.88/argief/berigte/beeld/1998/06/5/14/3.html

1965 births
Living people
South African dramatists and playwrights
People from Potchefstroom